Even Enersen Ormestad (born  9 November 1978 in Tønsberg, Norway) is a Norwegian bass guitarist and music producer, known as a member of the band Jaga Jazzist.

Career
Ormestad is educated in jazz and music production at Norges Musikkhøgskole and runs the studio Albatross Recorders together with Hasse Rosbach and Martin Sjølie.

He is together with the brothers  Martin and Lars Horntveth part of the original lineup in Jaga Jazzist and has contributed with his bass and keyboards on recordings and tours with, among others Marit Larsen, Thom Hell, Bertine Zetlitz and Hanne Hukkelberg.  In addition, he has worked as a producer and technician, often in collaboration with Audun Borrmann or Thomas Helland, for artists like Thom Hell, Hilde Marie Kjersem, Rockettothesky, Christer Knutsen, Bellman, Jonas Alaska, Marion Ravn, Matilda and a number of other artists. Ormestad also contributes as a bassist and multi instrumentalist on many of these releases.

Ormestad has also been seasonal member of  the black metal band "Malignant Eternal" where he contributed to the studio album Alarm in 1999.

In 2015, Ormestad began touring as bassist for the Norwegian band a-ha on their "Cast in Steel" tour.

Discography
Albums
Jævla Jazzist Grete Stitz (Thug Records, 1996)
A Livingroom Hush (Smalltown Supersound, 2002)
The Stix (WEA International Inc., 2003)
What We Must (Ninja Tune, 2005)
One-Armed Bandit (Ninja Tune, 2010)

EPs
Magazine (1998)
Airborne/Going Down (WEA International Inc., 2001)
Days (Smalltown Supersound, 2002)
Animal Chin (Gold Standard Laboratories, 2003)
Day (Ninja Tune, 2004)
Bananfluer Overalt (Ninja Tune, 2010)

DVDs
Live at Cosmopolite (Smalltown Supersound, 2009)

With Jonas Alaska
Jonas Alaska (Jansen Plateproduksjon, 2011)

References

External links 
Jaga Jazzist's official homepage

Jaga Jazzist members
20th-century Norwegian bass guitarists
Norwegian male bass guitarists
21st-century Norwegian bass guitarists
Norwegian rock bass guitarists
Norwegian jazz bass guitarists
Musicians from Tønsberg
1978 births
Living people
Male jazz musicians